John is a common English name and surname:

 John (given name)
 John (surname)

John may also refer to:

New Testament

Works 

 Gospel of John, a title often shortened to John
 First Epistle of John, often shortened to 1 John
 Second Epistle of John, often shortened to 2 John
 Third Epistle of John, often shortened to 3 John

People 
 John the Baptist (died c. AD 30), regarded as a prophet and the forerunner of Jesus Christ
 John the Apostle (lived c. AD 30), one of the twelve apostles of Jesus
 John the Evangelist, assigned author of the Fourth Gospel, once identified with the Apostle
 John of Patmos, also known as John the Divine or John the Revelator, the author of the Book of Revelation, once identified with the Apostle
 John the Presbyter, a figure either identified with or distinguished from the Apostle, the Evangelist and John of Patmos

Other people with the given name

Religious figures 
 John, father of Andrew the Apostle and Saint Peter
 Pope John (disambiguation), several popes
 Saint John (disambiguation), many people
 John of Antioch (historian), a chronicler of the 7th century
 John (Archdeacon of Barnstaple), medieval archdeacon in England
 John (Bishop of Ardfert) (died 1286), Irish bishop
 John (bishop of Tripoli) (died c.1186), Roman Catholic bishops in the Kingdom of Jerusalem
 John (bishop of Wrocław) (11th century), Polish Roman Catholic bishop
 John (Pelushi) (Fatmir Pelushi), Metropolitan of Korça, Albania since 1999
 John (Roshchin) (Georgy Roshchin) (born 1974), Metropolitan of Vienna and Budapest in the Russian Orthodox Church since 2019
 John Vianney (1786–1859), French Catholic priest
 Metropolitan John (Ivan Stinka) (born 1935), primate of the Ukrainian Orthodox Church of Canada until 2010

Rulers and other political figures 
 John (constable of Armenia) (died 1343), regent of the Armenian Kingdom of Cilicia
 John of Austria (disambiguation), several people
 John of Bohemia (1296–1346), called John the Blind, king from 1310
 John of Denmark, Norway, and Sweden, better known as Hans of Denmark (1455–1513)
 John of England (1166–1216), king and younger brother of Richard I
 John I of Hungary or János Szapolyai (1487–1540), king from 1526
 John (knez), 13th-century leader in Oltenia
 John (Mauro-Roman king) (died 546), king from 545
 John of Poland (disambiguation), three people
 John of Scotland also known as John de Balliol (c. 1249–1314), king from 1292 to 1296
 Infante John, Duke of Valencia de Campos (1349–1397)
 John, Lord of Reguengos de Monsaraz (1400–1442)
 Infante John of Coimbra, Prince of Antioch (1431–1457)
 Infante John, Duke of Viseu (1448–1472), 3rd Duke of Viseu, 2nd Duke of Beja, King Manuel I's older brother
 John the Scythian, a general and politician of the Eastern Roman Empire, consul in 498
 John the Hunchback, a general and politician of the Eastern Roman Empire, consul in 499
 John (nephew of Vitalian), a Byzantine general under Justinian I
 John (Sicilian admiral), 12th century
 John Troglita, a 6th-century Byzantine general
 John of Gaunt, 1st Duke of Lancaster  (1340–1399), third son of Edward III, King of England
 Prince John of the United Kingdom (1905–1919), prince of the United Kingdom, youngest son/child of George V

Arts and entertainment

Fictional characters 
 John (Tomorrow People), appearing in the children's science-fiction TV series The Tomorrow People
 John (John and Gillian), appearing in the Doctor Who TV comic strip
 John-117, or Master Chief, the protagonist of the video game franchise Halo
 John Constantine, a fictional character appearing in DC Comics franchise, including Hellblazer

Literature 
 John, a 1927 play by Philip Barry
 JOHN, a 2014 play by Lloyd Newson
 John (2005 book), a book by Cynthia Lennon about musician John Lennon

Songs 
 "John" (Desireless song)
 "John" (Lil Wayne song)

Other uses 
 John (ship), several ships
 Slang for a toilet
 Slang for a person who hires a prostitute
 John Peaks, mountains on Powell Island, Antarctica
 John the Ripper, password strength checking program (the executable program is simply "john")
 Tropical Storm John (disambiguation), tropical cyclones appearing in the eastern Pacific Ocean

See also 
 
 
 Alternate forms for the name John
 Hone (name)
 Ivan (disambiguation)
 Johnny (disambiguation)
 Johns (disambiguation)
 Jon (disambiguation)
 Yahya (disambiguation)
 Johanan (name), a male given name
 Yohannan (disambiguation)